Bishop Manolo Alarcon de los Santos (born August 5, 1947, Basud, Camarines Norte)   is the current bishop of the Diocese of Virac.

Priesthood
He was ordained to the priesthood on May 7, 1974 as a priest of the Archdiocese of Caceres. On August 12, 1994 Pope John Paul II appointed him Bishop of Diocese of Virac. The prefect of the Congregation for the clergy, José Cardinal Sánchez, consecrated him on September 12, 1994 as the bishop. His principal co-consecrators were the Apostolic Nuncio to the Philippines, Archbishop Gian Vincenzo Moreni, and the Archbishop of Caceres, Leonard Zamora Legaspi OP.

References

1947 births
21st-century Roman Catholic bishops in the Philippines
20th-century Roman Catholic bishops in the Philippines
Living people

Sources

catholic-hierarchy